A by-election was held for the Australian House of Representatives seat of Flinders on 18 October 1952. This was triggered by the death of Liberal MP Rupert Ryan.

The by-election was won by Labor candidate Keith Ewert.

Results

References

1952 elections in Australia
Victorian federal by-elections
1950s in Victoria (Australia)